Keminub was an ancient Egyptian woman with the title king's wife. She is only known from her burial next to the pyramid of Amenemhet II at Dahshur. For that reason, it has been suggested she was his wife.

Keminub was buried together with a treasurer named Amenhotep, who is dated to the 13th Dynasty. The style of her coffin and burial is close to burials of the 13th dynasty. She may therefore have been a queen of this dynasty instead. The name of her husband is so far unknown. On the fragments of her coffin appears one of the earliest attestations of chapter 151 of the Book of the Dead.

References

Literature
Jacques Jean Marie de Morgan: Fouilles à Dahchour en 1894-1895, Wien 1903, p. 70, fig. 117
Peter Janosi: Keminub - eine Gemahlin Amenemhets II.?, In: Zwischen den beiden Ewigkeiten, Festschrift Gertrud Thausing, Bietak, Manfred (Hrsg.), p. 94 - 101

18th-century BC women
17th-century BC women
Queens consort of the Thirteenth Dynasty of Egypt